Smoke exhaust ductwork, in Europe, is typically protected via passive fire protection means, subject to fire testing (typically to NBN EN 1366-8) and listing and approval use and compliance. It is used to remove smoke from buildings, ships or offshore structures to enable emergency evacuation as well as improved firefighting. In North America, fireproofed ductwork may be used for the purpose of smoke exhaust, but it is more common to use unfireproofed return air ductwork, whereby no fire testing or listings are employed to qualify the ductwork for this use.

Means of construction
Smoke exhaust can be built using:

ordinary sheet metal with external fireproofing treatment; or
a proprietary duct that is inherently fire-resistant; or
Fire resistant materials, such as calcium silicate.

Gallery

See also
Passive fire protection
Pressurisation ductwork
Heat and smoke vent
Grease duct
Calcium silicate
Fireproofing
Firestop
HVAC
Listing and approval use and compliance
Smoke
Fire
Emergency evacuation

External links
Smoke Extraction in Buildings Slide Show by Vysakh Manohar
ISO6944 - 2008 Fire containment -- Elements of building construction -- Part 1: Ventilation ducts
"Wisegeek" page on return air ductwork. Return air ductwork can be co-opted for cold smoke exhaust in North America

Passive fire protection
Heating, ventilation, and air conditioning